Gerrit Jacques Snyman (born 10 May 1994) is a South African cricketer. A batting all-rounder, he bats right-handed and bowls off spin. He made his South Africa debut in a Twenty20 International (T20I) against Pakistan in February 2021.

Career
Snyman was included in the Northern Cape squad for the 2016 Africa T20 Cup. He made his Twenty20 (T20) debut for Northern Cape against South Western Districts on 16 September 2016. He made his first-class debut for Northern Cape on 1 December 2016 in the 2016–17 Sunfoil 3-Day Cup. He made his List A debut for Northern Cape on 17 December 2016 in the 2016–17 CSA Provincial One-Day Challenge.

Snyman was the leading run-scorer in the 2017–18 Sunfoil 3-Day Cup for Northern Cape, with 695 runs in seven matches. In September 2018, he was named in Northern Cape's squad for the 2018 Africa T20 Cup. He was the leading run-scorer for Northern Cape in the 2018–19 CSA 3-Day Provincial Cup, with 381 runs in four matches.

In September 2019, Snyman was named in Northern Cape's squad for the 2019–20 CSA Provincial T20 Cup.

In January 2021, Snyman was named in South Africa's T20I squad for their series against Pakistan. He made his T20I debut for South Africa, against Pakistan, on 11 February 2021.

In April 2021, Snyman was named in Free State's squad, ahead of the 2021–22 cricket season in South Africa.

References

External links
 

1994 births
Living people
Cricketers from Pretoria
South African cricketers
South Africa Twenty20 International cricketers
Northern Cape cricketers
Knights cricketers
Jozi Stars cricketers
Free State cricketers